The Lone Rider is a 1930 American western film directed by Louis King and starring Buck Jones, Vera Reynolds and Harry Woods. It was remade twice by Columbia first as The Man Trailer (1934) and then The Thundering West (1939).

Cast
 Buck Jones as Jim Lanning (as Charles 'Buck' Jones)
 Vera Reynolds as Mary Stevens
 Harry Woods as Ed Farrell
 George C. Pearce as Judge Stevens (as George Pearce)
 Tom Bay as Henchman Bull
 Buck Bucko as Henchman
 Roy Bucko as Henchman
 Bob Burns as Henchman
 Buck Connors as Townsman
 Jim Corey as Henchman
 Rube Dalroy as Pipe-Smoking Townsman
 Jack Kirk as Henchman
 Charles Le Moyne as Stage Guard
 Cliff Lyons as Henchman
 Jim Mason as Henchman
 Lafe McKee as Corwin
 Tex Phelps as Townsman
 George Plues as Henchman
 Blackjack Ward as Williams

References

Bibliography
 Fetrow, Alan G. . Sound films, 1927-1939: a United States Filmography. McFarland, 1992.
 Pitts, Michael R. Western Movies: A Guide to 5,105 Feature Films. McFarland, 2012.

External links
 

1930 films
1930 Western (genre) films
American Western (genre) films
Films directed by Louis King
Columbia Pictures films
American black-and-white films
1930s English-language films
1930s American films